Bamboo in the Wind is a 1990 novel written by Filipino author  and Palanca Memorial Awards recipient Azucena Grajo Uranza. Chronologically, Bamboo in the Wind comes after Uranza's other novel A Passing Season.

About the Book

Plot description
In 1972, months prior to the Martial Law declaration, Larry Esteva arrived in Manila, Philippines after studying in Boston, Massachusetts. At Manila International Airport, he witnessed a demonstration being dispersed by the Philippine military. Uranza portrayed the "last desperate efforts" of Filipinos – through characters that include a senator, a youthful nationalist, a dispossessed farmer, a drastic protester, a convent school girl, and a Jesuit academic – to prevent the fall of the Philippines under martial rule. But the political plague accompanied by demonstrations, demolitions, murders, burnings, arrests and tortures continued unhindered until Martial Law was officially declared in the month of September.

About 
Larry Esteva, coming home from studies in Boston, witnesses at the airport a riotous demonstration that is forcibly dispersed by the military. The end of his journey turns out to be the beginning of an odyssey in his beloved city where he finds "an insidious lawlessness creeping upon the land."

Set in Manila in the last beleaguered months before the declaration of martial law in 1972, the book tells of the last desperate efforts of a people fighting to stave off disaster.

Amid the escalating madness of a regime gone berserk, an odd assortment of people – a senator, a young nationalist, a dispossessed farmer, a radical activist, a convent school girl, a Jesuit scholastic – make their way along the labyrinthine corridors of greed and power. Each must confront himself and examine his own commitment in the face of brutality and evil, as the book conjures up scene after scene of devastation: the massacre of the demonstrators, the demolition of Sapang Bato, the murder of the sugar plantation workers, the burning of the Laguardia rice fields. And as a climax to the mounting crescendo of violence, that final September day – the arrests, the torture, and finally the darkness overtakes the land.

References

1990 novels
Philippine English-language novels
Fiction set in 1972
Novels set in Manila